The Minister for Northern Australia is an Australian Government cabinet position which is currently held by Madeleine King following the swearing in of the full Albanese ministry on 1 June 2022.

In the Government of Australia, the minister administers this portfolio through the Department of Infrastructure, Transport, Regional Development, Communications and the Arts.

List of Ministers for Northern Australia
The following individuals have been appointed as Minister for Northern Australia, or any of its precedent titles:

Notes
 In 1972, Whitlam appointed both a Minister for the Northern Territory, Kep Enderby, and a Minister for Northern Development, Rex Patterson. From October 1973, Patterson held both titles, with the former title changing to Minister for Northern Australia. In October 1975, Patterson stood aside as Minister for Northern Australia, but remained as Minister for Northern Development until November 1975.

References

External links
 

Northern Australia
Northern Australia